

Africa

President – Abdelaziz Bouteflika, President of Algeria (1999–2019)
Prime Minister – Abdelmalek Sellal, Prime Minister of Algeria (2012–2014)

President – José Eduardo dos Santos, President of Angola (1979–2017)

President – Thomas Boni Yayi, President of Benin (2006–2016)
Prime Minister – Pascal Koupaki, Prime Minister of Benin (2011–2013)

President – Ian Khama, President of Botswana (2008–2018)

President – Blaise Compaoré, President of Burkina Faso (1987–2014)
Prime Minister – Luc-Adolphe Tiao, Prime Minister of Burkina Faso (2011–2014)

President – Pierre Nkurunziza, President of Burundi (2005–2020)

President – Paul Biya, President of Cameroon (1982–present)
Prime Minister – Philémon Yang, Prime Minister of Cameroon (2009–2019)

President – Jorge Carlos Fonseca, President of Cape Verde (2011–2021)
Prime Minister – José Maria Neves, Prime Minister of Cape Verde (2001–2016)

Head of State –
François Bozizé, President of the Central African Republic (2003–2013)
Michel Djotodia, Head of State of the Transition of the Central African Republic (2013–2014)
Prime Minister –
Faustin-Archange Touadéra, Prime Minister of the Central African Republic (2008–2013)
Nicolas Tiangaye, Prime Minister of the Central African Republic (2013–2014)

President – Idriss Déby, President of Chad (1990–2021)
Prime Minister –
Emmanuel Nadingar, Prime Minister of Chad (2010–2013)
Djimrangar Dadnadji, Prime Minister of Chad (2013)
Kalzeubet Pahimi Deubet, Prime Minister of Chad (2013–2016)

President – Ikililou Dhoinine, President of the Comoros (2011–2016)

President – Denis Sassou Nguesso, President of the Republic of the Congo (1997–present)

President – Joseph Kabila, President of the Democratic Republic of the Congo (2001–2019)
Prime Minister – Augustin Matata Ponyo, Prime Minister of the Democratic Republic of the Congo (2012–2016)

President – Ismaïl Omar Guelleh, President of Djibouti (1999–present)
Prime Minister –
Dileita Mohamed Dileita, Prime Minister of Djibouti (2001–2013)
Abdoulkader Kamil Mohamed, Prime Minister of Djibouti (2013–present)

President –
Mohamed Morsi, President of Egypt (2012–2013)
Adly Mansour, Acting President of Egypt (2013–2014)
Prime Minister –
Hesham Qandil, Prime Minister of Egypt (2012–2013)
Hazem El Beblawi, Acting Prime Minister of Egypt (2013–2014)

President – Teodoro Obiang Nguema Mbasogo, President of Equatorial Guinea (1979–present)
Prime Minister – Vicente Ehate Tomi, Prime Minister of Equatorial Guinea (2012–2016)

President – Isaias Afwerki, President of Eritrea (1991–present)

President –
Girma Wolde-Giorgis, President of Ethiopia (2001–2013)
Mulatu Teshome, President of Ethiopia (2013–2018)
Prime Minister – Hailemariam Desalegn, Prime Minister of Ethiopia (2012–2018)

President – Ali Bongo Ondimba, President of Gabon (2009–present)
Prime Minister – Raymond Ndong Sima, Prime Minister of Gabon (2012–2014)

President – Yahya Jammeh, President of the Gambia (1994–2017)

President – John Dramani Mahama, President of Ghana (2012–2017)

President – Alpha Condé, President of Guinea (2010–2021)
Prime Minister – Mohamed Said Fofana, Prime Minister of Guinea (2010–2015)

President – Manuel Serifo Nhamadjo, Acting President of Guinea-Bissau (2012–2014)
Prime Minister – Rui Duarte de Barros, Acting Prime Minister of Guinea-Bissau (2012–2014)

President – Alassane Ouattara, President of the Ivory Coast (2010–present)
Prime Minister – Daniel Kablan Duncan, Prime Minister of the Ivory Coast (2012–2017)

President –
Mwai Kibaki, President of Kenya (2002–2013)
Uhuru Kenyatta, President of Kenya (2013–present)
Prime Minister – Raila Odinga, Prime Minister of Kenya (2008–2013)

Monarch – Letsie III, King of Lesotho (1996–present)
Prime Minister – Tom Thabane, Prime Minister of Lesotho (2012–2015)

President – Ellen Johnson Sirleaf, President of Liberia (2006–2018)

Head of State –
Mohammed Magariaf, Chairman of the General National Congress of Libya (2012–2013)
Giuma Ahmed Atigha, Acting Chairman of the General National Congress of Libya (2013)
Nouri Abusahmain, Chairman of the General National Congress of Libya (2013–2014)
Prime Minister – Ali Zeidan, Prime Minister of Libya (2012–2014)

Head of State – Andry Rajoelina, President of the High Transitional Authority of Madagascar (2009–2014)
Prime Minister – Omer Beriziky, Prime Minister of Madagascar (2011–2014)

President – Joyce Banda, President of Malawi (2012–2014)

President –
Dioncounda Traoré, Acting President of Mali (2012–2013)
Ibrahim Boubacar Keïta, President of Mali (2013–2020)
Prime Minister –
Django Sissoko, Acting Prime Minister of Mali (2012–2013)
Oumar Tatam Ly, Prime Minister of Mali (2013–2014)

President – Mohamed Ould Abdel Aziz, President of Mauritania (2009–2019)
Prime Minister – Moulaye Ould Mohamed Laghdaf, Prime Minister of Mauritania (2008–2014)

President – Kailash Purryag, President of Mauritius (2012–2015)
Prime Minister – Navin Ramgoolam, Prime Minister of Mauritius (2005–2014)

Monarch – Mohammed VI, King of Morocco (1999–present)
Prime Minister – Abdelilah Benkirane, Head of Government of Morocco (2011–2017)
 (self-declared, partially recognised state)
President – Mohamed Abdelaziz, President of Western Sahara (1976–2016)
Prime Minister – Abdelkader Taleb Omar, Prime Minister of Western Sahara (2003–2018)

President – Armando Guebuza, President of Mozambique (2005–2015)
Prime Minister – Alberto Vaquina, Prime Minister of Mozambique (2012–2015)

President – Hifikepunye Pohamba, President of Namibia (2005–2015)
Prime Minister – Hage Geingob, Prime Minister of Namibia (2012–2015)

President – Mahamadou Issoufou, President of Niger (2011–2021)
Prime Minister – Brigi Rafini, Prime Minister of Niger (2011–2021)

President – Goodluck Jonathan, President of Nigeria (2010–2015)

President – Paul Kagame, President of Rwanda (2000–present)
Prime Minister – Pierre Habumuremyi, Prime Minister of Rwanda (2011–2014)
 (Overseas Territory of the United Kingdom)
Governor – Mark Andrew Capes, Governor of Saint Helena (2011–2016)

President – Manuel Pinto da Costa, President of São Tomé and Príncipe (2011–2016)
Prime Minister – Gabriel Costa, Prime Minister of São Tomé and Príncipe (2012–2014)

President – Macky Sall, President of Senegal (2012–present)
Prime Minister –
Abdoul Mbaye, Prime Minister of Senegal (2012–2013)
Aminata Touré, Prime Minister of Senegal (2013–2014)

President – James Michel, President of Seychelles (2004–2016)

President – Ernest Bai Koroma, President of Sierra Leone (2007–2018)

President – Hassan Sheikh Mohamud, President of Somalia (2012–2017)
Prime Minister –
Abdi Farah Shirdon, Prime Minister of Somalia (2012–2013)
Abdiweli Sheikh Ahmed, Prime Minister of Somalia (2013–2014)
 (unrecognised, secessionist state)
President – Ahmed Mohamed Mohamoud, President of Somaliland (2010–2017)
 (self-declared autonomous state)
President – Abdirahman Farole, President of Puntland (2009–2014)

President – Jacob Zuma, President of South Africa (2009–2018)

President – Salva Kiir Mayardit, President of South Sudan (2005–present)

President – Omar al-Bashir, President of Sudan (1989–2019)

Monarch – Mswati III, King of Swaziland (1986–present)
Prime Minister – Barnabas Sibusiso Dlamini, Prime Minister of Swaziland (2008–2018)

President – Jakaya Kikwete, President of Tanzania (2005–2015)
Prime Minister – Mizengo Pinda, Prime Minister of Tanzania (2008–2015)

President – Faure Gnassingbé, President of Togo (2005–present)
Prime Minister – Kwesi Ahoomey-Zunu, Prime Minister of Togo (2012–2015)

President – Moncef Marzouki, President of Tunisia (2011–2014)
Prime Minister –
Hamadi Jebali, Prime Minister of Tunisia (2011–2013)
Ali Laarayedh, Prime Minister of Tunisia (2013–2014)

President – Yoweri Museveni, President of Uganda (1986–present)
Prime Minister – Amama Mbabazi, Prime Minister of Uganda (2011–2014)

President – Michael Sata, President of Zambia (2011–2014)

President – Robert Mugabe, President of Zimbabwe (1987–2017)
Prime Minister – Morgan Tsvangirai, Prime Minister of Zimbabwe (2009–2013)

Asia
 
President – Hamid Karzai, President of Afghanistan (2002–2014)

Monarch – Sheikh Hamad bin Isa Al Khalifa, King of Bahrain (1999–present)
Prime Minister – Prince Khalifa bin Salman Al Khalifa, Prime Minister of Bahrain (1970–2020)

President –
Zillur Rahman, President of Bangladesh (2009–2013)
Abdul Hamid, President of Bangladesh (2013–present)
Prime Minister – Sheikh Hasina, Prime Minister of Bangladesh (2009–present)

Monarch – Jigme Khesar Namgyel Wangchuck, King of Bhutan (2006–present)
Prime Minister –
Jigme Thinley, Prime Minister of Bhutan (2008–2013)
Tshering Tobgay, Prime Minister of Bhutan (2013–2018)

Monarch – Hassanal Bolkiah, Sultan of Brunei (1967–present)
Prime Minister – Hassanal Bolkiah, Prime Minister of Brunei (1984–present)

Monarch – Norodom Sihamoni, King of Cambodia (2004–present)
Prime Minister – Hun Sen, Prime Minister of Cambodia (1985–present)

Communist Party Leader – Xi Jinping, General Secretary of the Chinese Communist Party (2012–present)
President –
Hu Jintao, President of China (2003–2013)
Xi Jinping, President of China (2013–present)
Premier –
Wen Jiabao, Premier of the State Council of China (2003–2013)
Li Keqiang, Premier of the State Council of China (2013–present)

President – Taur Matan Ruak, President of East Timor (2012–2017)
Prime Minister – Xanana Gusmão, Prime Minister of East Timor (2007–2015)

President – Pranab Mukherjee, President of India (2012–2017)
Prime Minister – Manmohan Singh, Prime Minister of India (2004–2014)

President – Susilo Bambang Yudhoyono, President of Indonesia (2004–2014)

Supreme Leader – Ayatollah Ali Khamenei, Supreme Leader of Iran (1989–present)
President –
Mahmoud Ahmadinejad, President of Iran (2005–2013)
Hassan Rouhani, President of Iran (2013–2021)

President – Jalal Talabani, President of Iraq (2005–2014)
Prime Minister – Nouri al-Maliki, Prime Minister of Iraq (2006–2014)

President – Shimon Peres, President of Israel (2007–2014)
Prime Minister – Benjamin Netanyahu, Prime Minister of Israel (2009–2021)

Monarch – Akihito, Emperor of Japan (1989–2019)
Prime Minister – Shinzō Abe, Prime Minister of Japan (2012–2020)

Monarch – Abdullah II, King of Jordan (1999–present)
Prime Minister – Abdullah Ensour, Prime Minister of Jordan (2012–2016)

President – Nursultan Nazarbayev, President of Kazakhstan (1990–2019)
Prime Minister – Serik Akhmetov, Prime Minister of Kazakhstan (2012–2014)

Communist Party Leader – Kim Jong-un, First Secretary of the Workers' Party of Korea (2012–present)
De facto Head of State – Kim Jong-un, First Chairman of the National Defence Commission of North Korea (2011–present)
De jure Head of State – Kim Yong-nam, Chairman of the Presidium of the Supreme People's Assembly of North Korea (1998–2019)
Premier –
Choe Yong-rim, Premier of the Cabinet of North Korea (2010–2013)
Pak Pong-ju, Premier of the Cabinet of North Korea (2013–2019)

President –
Lee Myung-bak, President of South Korea (2008–2013)
Park Geun-hye, President of South Korea (2013–2017)
Prime Minister –
Kim Hwang-sik, Prime Minister of South Korea (2010–2013)
Chung Hong-won, Prime Minister of South Korea (2013–2015)

Monarch – Sheikh Sabah Al-Ahmad Al-Jaber Al-Sabah, Emir of Kuwait (2006–2020)
Prime Minister – Sheikh Jaber Al-Mubarak Al-Hamad Al-Sabah, Prime Minister of Kuwait (2011–2019)

President – Almazbek Atambayev, President of Kyrgyzstan (2011–2017)
Prime Minister – Zhantoro Satybaldiyev, Prime Minister of Kyrgyzstan (2012–2014)

Communist Party Leader – Choummaly Sayasone, General Secretary of the Lao People's Revolutionary Party (2006–2016)
President – Choummaly Sayasone, President of Laos (2006–2016)
Prime Minister – Thongsing Thammavong, Chairman of the Council of Ministers of Laos (2010–2016)

President – Michel Suleiman, President of Lebanon (2008–2014)
Prime Minister – Najib Mikati, President of the Council of Ministers of Lebanon (2011–2014)

Monarch – Tuanku Abdul Halim, Yang di-Pertuan Agong of Malaysia (2011–2016)
Prime Minister – Najib Razak, Prime Minister of Malaysia (2009–2018)

President –
Mohammed Waheed Hassan, President of the Maldives (2012–2013)
Abdulla Yameen, President of the Maldives (2013–2018)

President – Tsakhiagiin Elbegdorj, President of Mongolia (2009–2017)
Prime Minister – Norovyn Altankhuyag, Prime Minister of Mongolia (2012–2014)

President – Thein Sein, President of Myanmar (2011–2016)

President – Ram Baran Yadav, President of Nepal (2008–2015)
Prime Minister –
Baburam Bhattarai, Prime Minister of Nepal (2011–2013)
Khil Raj Regmi, Prime Minister of Nepal (2013–2014)

Monarch – Qaboos bin Said al Said, Sultan of Oman (1970–present)
Prime Minister – Qaboos bin Said al Said, Prime Minister of Oman (1972–present)

President –
Asif Ali Zardari, President of Pakistan (2008–2013)
Mamnoon Hussain, President of Pakistan (2013–2018)
Prime Minister –
Raja Pervaiz Ashraf, Prime Minister of Pakistan (2012–2013)
Mir Hazar Khan Khoso, Acting Prime Minister of Pakistan (2013)
Nawaz Sharif, Prime Minister of Pakistan (2013–2017)

, intergovernmentally through a UN 2012 resolution, from the Palestinian National Authority on 6 January
President – Mahmoud Abbas, President of Palestine (in the West Bank) (2005–present)
Prime Minister –
Salam Fayyad, Prime Minister of Palestine (in the West Bank) (2007–2013)
Rami Hamdallah, Prime Minister of  Palestine (in the West Bank) (2013–2019)
  Gaza Strip (rebelling against the Palestinian National Authority, in the West Bank)
President – Aziz Duwaik, Acting President of the Palestinian National Authority (in the Gaza Strip) (2009–2014)
Prime Minister – Ismail Haniyeh, Prime Minister of the Palestinian National Authority (in the Gaza Strip) (2007–2014)

President – Benigno Aquino, President of the Philippines (2010–2016)
 (unrecognised, secessionist state)
declared independence on 12 August; extinguished on 28 September
President – Nur Misuari, President of the Bangsamoro Republik (2013)

Monarch –
Sheikh Hamad bin Khalifa Al Thani, Emir of Qatar (1995–2013)
Sheikh Tamim bin Hamad Al Thani, Emir of Qatar (2013–present)
Prime Minister –
Sheikh Hamad bin Jassim bin Jaber Al Thani, Prime Minister of Qatar (2007–2013)
Sheikh Abdullah bin Nasser bin Khalifa Al Thani, Prime Minister of Qatar (2013–2020)

Monarch – Abdullah, King of Saudi Arabia (2005–2015)
Prime Minister – Abdullah, Prime Minister of Saudi Arabia (2005–2015)

President – Tony Tan, President of Singapore (2011–2017)
Prime Minister – Lee Hsien Loong, Prime Minister of Singapore (2004–present)

President – Mahinda Rajapaksa, President of Sri Lanka (2005–2015)
Prime Minister – D. M. Jayaratne, Prime Minister of Sri Lanka (2010–2015)
Syria

President – Bashar al-Assad, President of Syria (2000–present)
Prime Minister – Wael Nader al-Halqi, Prime Minister of Syria (2012–2016)
 (partially recognised, rival government)
the Syrian National Coalition formed the Interim Government on 19 March
President –
Moaz al-Khatib, President of the Syrian National Coalition (2012–2013)
George Sabra, Acting President of the Syrian National Coalition (2013)
Ahmad Jarba, President of the Syrian National Coalition (2013–2014)
Prime Minister –
Ghassan Hitto, Acting Prime Minister of the Syrian National Coalition (2013)
Ahmad Tu'mah, Prime Minister of the Syrian National Coalition (2013–2014)

President – Ma Ying-jeou, President of Taiwan (2008–2016)
Premier –
Sean Chen, President of the Executive Yuan of Taiwan (2012–2013)
Jiang Yi-huah, President of the Executive Yuan of Taiwan (2013–2014)

President – Emomali Rahmon, President of Tajikistan (1992–present)
Prime Minister –
Oqil Oqilov, Prime Minister of Tajikistan (1999–2013)
Kokhir Rasulzoda, Prime Minister of Tajikistan (2013–present)

Monarch – Bhumibol Adulyadej, King of Thailand (1946–2016)
Prime Minister – Yingluck Shinawatra, Prime Minister of Thailand (2011–2014)

President – Abdullah Gül, President of Turkey (2007–2014)
Prime Minister – Recep Tayyip Erdoğan, Prime Minister of Turkey (2003–2014)

President – Gurbanguly Berdimuhamedow, President of Turkmenistan (2006–2022)

President – Sheikh Khalifa bin Zayed Al Nahyan, President of the United Arab Emirates (2004–present)
Prime Minister – Sheikh Mohammed bin Rashid Al Maktoum, Prime Minister of the United Arab Emirates (2006–present)

President – Islam Karimov, President of Uzbekistan (1990–2016)
Prime Minister – Shavkat Mirziyoyev, Prime Minister of Uzbekistan (2003–2016)

Communist Party Leader – Nguyễn Phú Trọng, General Secretary of the Communist Party of Vietnam (2011–present)
President – Trương Tấn Sang, President of Vietnam (2011–2016)
Prime Minister – Nguyễn Tấn Dũng, Prime Minister of Vietnam (2006–2016)

President – Abdrabbuh Mansur Hadi, President of Yemen (2012–present)
Prime Minister – Mohammed Basindawa, Prime Minister of Yemen (2011–2014)

Europe

President – Bujar Nishani, President of Albania (2012–2017)
Prime Minister –
Sali Berisha, Prime Minister of Albania (2005–2013)
Edi Rama, Prime Minister of Albania (2013–present)

Monarchs –
French Co-Prince – François Hollande, French Co-prince of Andorra (2012–2017)
Co-Prince's Representative – Sylvie Hubac (2012–2015)
Episcopal Co-Prince – Archbishop Joan Enric Vives Sicília, Episcopal Co-prince of Andorra (2003–present)
Co-Prince's Representative – Josep Maria Mauri (2012–present)
Prime Minister – Antoni Martí, Head of Government of Andorra (2011–2015)

President – Serzh Sargsyan, President of Armenia (2008–2018)
Prime Minister – Tigran Sargsyan, Prime Minister of Armenia (2008–2014)

President – Heinz Fischer, Federal President of Austria (2004–2016)
Chancellor – Werner Faymann, Federal Chancellor of Austria (2008–2016)

President – Ilham Aliyev, President of Azerbaijan (2003–present)
Prime Minister – Artur Rasizade, Prime Minister of Azerbaijan (2003–2018)
 (unrecognised, secessionist state)
President – Bako Sahakyan, President of Nagorno-Karabakh (2007–2020)
Prime Minister – Arayik Harutyunyan, Prime Minister of Nagorno-Karabakh (2007–2017)

President – Alexander Lukashenko, President of Belarus (1994–present)
Prime Minister – Mikhail Myasnikovich, Prime Minister of Belarus (2010–2014)

Monarch –
Albert II, King of the Belgians (1993–2013)
Philippe, King of the Belgians (2013–present)
Prime Minister – Elio Di Rupo, Prime Minister of Belgium (2011–2014)

Head of State – Presidency of Bosnia and Herzegovina
Serb Member – Nebojša Radmanović (2006–2014; Chairman of the Presidency of Bosnia and Herzegovina, 2012–2013)
Croat Member – Željko Komšić (2006–2014; Chairman of the Presidency of Bosnia and Herzegovina, 2013–2014)
Bosniak Member – Bakir Izetbegović (2010–2018)
Prime Minister – Vjekoslav Bevanda, Chairman of the Council of Ministers of Bosnia and Herzegovina (2012–2015)
High Representative – Valentin Inzko, High Representative for Bosnia and Herzegovina (2009–2021)

President – Rosen Plevneliev, President of Bulgaria (2012–2017)
Prime Minister –
Boyko Borisov, Prime Minister of Bulgaria (2009–2013)
Marin Raykov, Acting Prime Minister of Bulgaria (2013)
Plamen Oresharski, Prime Minister of Bulgaria (2013–2014)

President – Ivo Josipović, President of Croatia (2010–2015)
Prime Minister – Zoran Milanović, Prime Minister of Croatia (2011–2016)

President –
Demetris Christofias, President of Cyprus (2008–2013)
Nicos Anastasiades, President of Cyprus (2013–present)
 (unrecognised, secessionist state)
President – Derviş Eroğlu, President of Northern Cyprus (2010–2015)
Prime Minister –
İrsen Küçük, Prime Minister of Northern Cyprus (2010–2013)
Sibel Siber, Prime Minister of Northern Cyprus (2013)
Özkan Yorgancıoğlu, Prime Minister of Northern Cyprus (2013–2015)

President –
Václav Klaus, President of the Czech Republic (2003–2013)
Miloš Zeman, President of the Czech Republic (2013–present)
Prime Minister –
Petr Nečas, Prime Minister of the Czech Republic (2010–2013)
Jiří Rusnok, Prime Minister of the Czech Republic (2013–2014)

Monarch – Margrethe II, Queen of Denmark (1972–present)
Prime Minister – Helle Thorning-Schmidt, Prime Minister of Denmark (2011–2015)

President – Toomas Hendrik Ilves, President of Estonia (2006–2016)
Prime Minister – Andrus Ansip, Prime Minister of Estonia (2005–2014)

President – Sauli Niinistö, President of Finland (2012–present)
Prime Minister – Jyrki Katainen, Prime Minister of Finland (2011–2014)

President – François Hollande, President of France (2012–2017)
Prime Minister – Jean-Marc Ayrault, Prime Minister of France (2012–2014)

President –
Mikheil Saakashvili, President of Georgia (2008–2013)
Giorgi Margvelashvili, President of Georgia (2013–2018)
Prime Minister –
Bidzina Ivanishvili, Prime Minister of Georgia (2012–2013)
Irakli Garibashvili, Prime Minister of Georgia (2013–2015)
 (partially recognised, secessionist state)
President – Alexander Ankvab, President of Abkhazia (2011–2014)
Prime Minister – Leonid Lakerbaia, Prime Minister of Abkhazia (2011–2014)
 (partially recognised, secessionist state)
President – Leonid Tibilov, President of South Ossetia (2012–2017)
Prime Minister – Rostislav Khugayev, Prime Minister of South Ossetia (2012–2014)

President – Joachim Gauck, Federal President of Germany (2012–2017)
Chancellor – Angela Merkel, Federal Chancellor of Germany (2005–2021)

President – Karolos Papoulias, President of Greece (2005–2015)
Prime Minister – Antonis Samaras, Prime Minister of Greece (2012–2015)

President – János Áder, President of Hungary (2012–present)
Prime Minister – Viktor Orbán, Prime Minister of Hungary (2010–present)

President – Ólafur Ragnar Grímsson, President of Iceland (1996–2016)
Prime Minister –
Jóhanna Sigurðardóttir, Prime Minister of Iceland (2009–2013)
Sigmundur Davíð Gunnlaugsson, Prime Minister of Iceland (2013–2016)

President – Michael D. Higgins, President of Ireland (2011–present)
Prime Minister – Enda Kenny, Taoiseach of Ireland (2011–2017)

President – Giorgio Napolitano, President of Italy (2006–2015)
Prime Minister –
Mario Monti, President of the Council of Ministers of Italy (2011–2013)
Enrico Letta, President of the Council of Ministers of Italy (2013–2014)

President – Andris Bērziņš, President of Latvia (2011–2015)
Prime Minister – Valdis Dombrovskis, Prime Minister of Latvia (2009–2014)

Monarch – Hans-Adam II, Prince Regnant of Liechtenstein (1989–present)
Regent – Hereditary Prince Alois, Regent of Liechtenstein (2004–present)
Prime Minister –
Klaus Tschütscher, Head of Government of Liechtenstein (2009–2013)
Adrian Hasler, Head of Government of Liechtenstein (2013–2021)

President – Dalia Grybauskaitė, President of Lithuania (2009–2019)
Prime Minister – Algirdas Butkevičius, Prime Minister of Lithuania (2012–2016)

Monarch – Henri, Grand Duke of Luxembourg (2000–present)
Prime Minister –
Jean-Claude Juncker, Prime Minister of Luxembourg (1995–2013)
Xavier Bettel, Prime Minister of Luxembourg (2013–present)

President – Gjorge Ivanov, President of Macedonia (2009–2019)
Prime Minister – Nikola Gruevski, President of the Government of Macedonia (2006–2016)

President – George Abela, President of Malta (2009–2014)
Prime Minister –
Lawrence Gonzi, Prime Minister of Malta (2004–2013)
Joseph Muscat, Prime Minister of Malta (2013–2020)

President – Nicolae Timofti, President of Moldova (2012–2016)
Prime Minister –
Vlad Filat, Prime Minister of Moldova (2009–2013)
Iurie Leancă, Prime Minister of Moldova (2013–2015)
 (unrecognised, secessionist state)
President – Yevgeny Shevchuk, President of Transnistria (2011–2016)
Prime Minister –
Pyotr Stepanov, Prime Minister of Transnistria (2012–2013)
Tatiana Turanskaya, Prime Minister of Transnistria (2013–2015)

Monarch – Albert II, Sovereign Prince of Monaco (2005–present)
Prime Minister – Michel Roger, Minister of State of Monaco (2010–2015)

President – Filip Vujanović, President of Montenegro (2003–2018)
Prime Minister – Milo Đukanović, Prime Minister of Montenegro (2012–2016)

Monarch –
Beatrix, Queen of the Netherlands (1980–2013)
Willem-Alexander, King of the Netherlands (2013–present)
 (constituent country)
Prime Minister – Mark Rutte, Prime Minister of the Netherlands (2010–present)
 (constituent country)
see 
 (constituent country)
see 
 (constituent country)
see 

Monarch – Harald V, King of Norway (1991–present)
Prime Minister –
Jens Stoltenberg, Prime Minister of Norway (2005–2013)
Erna Solberg, Prime Minister of Norway (2013–2021)

President – Bronisław Komorowski, President of Poland (2010–2015)
Prime Minister – Donald Tusk, Chairman of the Council of Ministers of Poland (2007–2014)

President – Aníbal Cavaco Silva, President of Portugal (2006–2016)
Prime Minister – Pedro Passos Coelho, Prime Minister of Portugal (2011–2015)

President – Traian Băsescu, President of Romania (2004–2014)
Prime Minister – Victor Ponta, Prime Minister of Romania (2012–2015)

President – Vladimir Putin, President of Russia (2012–present)
Prime Minister – Dmitry Medvedev, Chairman of the Government of Russia (2012–2020)

Captains-Regent –
Teodoro Lonfernini and Denise Bronzetti, Captains Regent of San Marino (2012–2013)
Antonella Mularoni and Denis Amici, Captains Regent of San Marino (2013)
Anna Maria Muccioli and Gian Carlo Capicchioni, Captains Regent of San Marino (2013–2014)

President – Tomislav Nikolić, President of Serbia (2012–2017)
Prime Minister – Ivica Dačić, Prime Minister of Serbia (2012–2014)
 (partially recognised, secessionist state; under nominal international administration)
President – Atifete Jahjaga, President of Kosovo (2011–2016)
Prime Minister – Hashim Thaçi, Prime Minister of Kosovo (2008–2014)
UN Special Representative – Farid Zarif, Special Representative of the UN Secretary-General for Kosovo (2011–2015)

President – Ivan Gašparovič, President of Slovakia (2004–2014)
Prime Minister – Robert Fico, Prime Minister of Slovakia (2012–2018)

President – Borut Pahor, President of Slovenia (2012–present)
Prime Minister –
Janez Janša, Prime Minister of Slovenia (2012–2013)
Alenka Bratušek, Prime Minister of Slovenia (2013–2014)

Monarch – Juan Carlos I, King of Spain (1975–2014)
Prime Minister – Mariano Rajoy, President of the Government of Spain (2011–2018)

Monarch – Carl XVI Gustaf, King of Sweden (1973–present)
Prime Minister – Fredrik Reinfeldt, Prime Minister of Sweden (2006–2014)

Council – Federal Council of Switzerland
Members – Doris Leuthard (2006–present), Eveline Widmer-Schlumpf (2008–2015), Ueli Maurer (2009–present; President of Switzerland, 2013), Didier Burkhalter (2009–present), Johann Schneider-Ammann (2010–present), Simonetta Sommaruga (2010–present), and Alain Berset (2012–present)

President – Viktor Yanukovych, President of Ukraine (2010–2014)
Prime Minister – Mykola Azarov, Prime Minister of Ukraine (2010–2014)

Monarch – Elizabeth II, Queen of the United Kingdom (1952–present)
Prime Minister – David Cameron, Prime Minister of the United Kingdom (2010–2016)
 (Crown dependency of the United Kingdom)
Lieutenant-Governor – Adam Wood, Lieutenant Governor of the Isle of Man (2011–2016)
Chief Minister – Allan Bell, Chief Minister of the Isle of Man (2011–2016)
 (Crown dependency of the United Kingdom)
Lieutenant-Governor – Peter Walker, Lieutenant Governor of Guernsey (2011–2015)
Chief Minister – Peter Harwood, Chief Minister of Guernsey (2012–2014)
 (Crown dependency of the United Kingdom)
Lieutenant-Governor – Sir John McColl, Lieutenant Governor of Jersey (2011–2016)
Chief Minister – Ian Gorst, Chief Minister of Jersey (2011–2018)
 (Overseas Territory of the United Kingdom)
Governor –
Sir Adrian Johns, Governor of Gibraltar (2009–2013)
Alison MacMillan, Acting Governor of Gibraltar (2013)
Sir James Dutton, Governor of Gibraltar (2013–2015)
Chief Minister – Fabian Picardo, Chief Minister of Gibraltar (2011–present)

Monarch –
Pope Benedict XVI, Sovereign of Vatican City (2005–2013)
Cardinal Tarcisio Bertone and Cardinal Angelo Sodano; interim Government during sede vacante (2013)
Pope Francis, Sovereign of Vatican City (2013–present)
Head of Government – Cardinal Giuseppe Bertello, President of the Governorate of Vatican City (2011–2021)
Holy See (sui generis subject of public international law)
Secretary of State –
Cardinal Tarcisio Bertone, Cardinal Secretary of State (2006–2013)
Archbishop Pietro Parolin, Pro tempore Secretary of State (2013–present)

North America
 (Overseas Territory of the United Kingdom)
Governor –
Alistair Harrison, Governor of Anguilla (2009–2013)
Stanley Reid, Acting Governor of Anguilla (2013)
Christina Scott, Governor of Anguilla (2013–2017)
Chief Minister – Hubert Hughes, Chief Minister of Anguilla (2010–2015)

Monarch – Elizabeth II, Queen of Antigua and Barbuda (1981–present)
Governor-General – Dame Louise Lake-Tack, Governor-General of Antigua and Barbuda (2007–2014)
Prime Minister – Baldwin Spencer, Prime Minister of Antigua and Barbuda (2004–2014)
 (constituent country of the Kingdom of the Netherlands)
Governor – Fredis Refunjol, Governor of Aruba (2004–2016)
Prime Minister – Mike Eman, Prime Minister of Aruba (2009–present)

Monarch – Elizabeth II, Queen of the Bahamas (1973–present)
Governor-General – Sir Arthur Foulkes, Governor-General of the Bahamas (2010–2014)
Prime Minister – Perry Christie, Prime Minister of the Bahamas (2012–2017)

Monarch – Elizabeth II, Queen of Barbados (1966–2021)
Governor-General – Sir Elliott Belgrave, Governor-General of Barbados (2012–2017)
Prime Minister – Freundel Stuart, Prime Minister of Barbados (2010–2018)

Monarch – Elizabeth II, Queen of Belize (1981–present)
Governor-General – Sir Colville Young, Governor-General of Belize (1993–2021)
Prime Minister – Dean Barrow, Prime Minister of Belize (2008–2020)
 (Overseas Territory of the United Kingdom)
Governor – George Fergusson, Governor of Bermuda (2012–2016)
Premier – Craig Cannonier, Premier of Bermuda (2012–2014)
 (Overseas Territory of the United Kingdom)
Governor – William Boyd McCleary, Governor of the British Virgin Islands (2010–2014)
Premier – Orlando Smith, Premier of the British Virgin Islands (2011–2019)

Monarch – Elizabeth II, Queen of Canada (1952–present)
Governor-General – David Johnston, Governor General of Canada (2010–2017)
Prime Minister – Stephen Harper, Prime Minister of Canada (2006–2015)
 (Overseas Territory of the United Kingdom)
Governor –
Duncan Taylor, Governor of the Cayman Islands (2010–2013)
Franz Manderson, Acting Governor of the Cayman Islands (2013)
Helen Kilpatrick, Governor of the Cayman Islands (2013–2018)
Premier –
Julianna O'Connor-Connolly, Premier of the Cayman Islands (2012–2013)
Alden McLaughlin, Premier of the Cayman Islands (2013–present)

President – Laura Chinchilla, President of Costa Rica (2010–2014)

Communist Party Leader – Raúl Castro, First Secretary of the Communist Party of Cuba (2011–2021)
President – Raúl Castro, President of the Council of State of Cuba (2008–2018)
Prime Minister – Raúl Castro, President of the Council of Ministers of Cuba (2008–2018)
 (constituent country of the Kingdom of the Netherlands)
Governor –
Adèle van der Pluijm-Vrede, Acting Governor of Curaçao (2012–2013)
Lucille George-Wout, Governor of Curaçao (2013–present)
Prime Minister –
Daniel Hodge, Prime Minister of Curaçao (2012–2013)
Ivar Asjes, Prime Minister of Curaçao (2013–2015)

President –
Eliud Williams, President of Dominica (2012–2013)
Charles Savarin, President of Dominica (2013–present)
Prime Minister – Roosevelt Skerrit, Prime Minister of Dominica (2004–present)

President – Danilo Medina, President of the Dominican Republic (2012–present)

President – Mauricio Funes, President of El Salvador (2009–2014)

Monarch – Elizabeth II, Queen of Grenada (1974–present)
Governor-General –
Sir Carlyle Glean, Governor-General of Grenada (2008–2013)
Dame Cécile La Grenade, Governor-General of Grenada (2013–present)
Prime Minister –
Tillman Thomas, Prime Minister of Grenada (2008–2013)
Keith Mitchell, Prime Minister of Grenada (2013–2022)

President – Otto Pérez Molina, President of Guatemala (2012–2015)

President – Michel Martelly, President of Haiti (2011–2016)
Prime Minister – Laurent Lamothe, Prime Minister of Haiti (2012–2014)

President – Porfirio Lobo Sosa, President of Honduras (2010–2014)

Monarch – Elizabeth II, Queen of Jamaica (1962–present)
Governor-General – Sir Patrick Allen, Governor-General of Jamaica (2009–present)
Prime Minister – Portia Simpson-Miller, Prime Minister of Jamaica (2012–2016)

President – Enrique Peña Nieto, President of Mexico (2012–2018)
 (Overseas Territory of the United Kingdom)
Governor – Adrian Davis, Governor of Montserrat (2011–2015)
Premier – Reuben Meade, Premier of Montserrat (2009–2014)

President – Daniel Ortega, President of Nicaragua (2007–present)

President – Ricardo Martinelli, President of Panama (2009–2014)
  (overseas collectivity of France)
Prefect – Philippe Chopin, Prefect of Saint Barthélemy (2011–2015)
Head of Government – Bruno Magras, President of the Territorial Council of Saint Barthélemy (2007–present)

Monarch – Elizabeth II, Queen of Saint Kitts and Nevis (1983–present)
Governor-General –
Sir Cuthbert Sebastian, Governor-General of Saint Kitts and Nevis (1996–2013)
Sir Edmund Lawrence, Governor-General of Saint Kitts and Nevis (2013–2015)
Prime Minister – Denzil Douglas, Prime Minister of Saint Kitts and Nevis (1995–2015)

Monarch – Elizabeth II, Queen of Saint Lucia (1979–present)
Governor-General – Dame Pearlette Louisy, Governor-General of Saint Lucia (1997–2017)
Prime Minister – Kenny Anthony, Prime Minister of Saint Lucia (2011–2016)
 (overseas collectivity of France)
Prefect – Philippe Chopin, Prefect of Saint Martin (2011–2015)
Head of Government –
Alain Richardson, President of the Territorial Council of Saint Martin (2012–2013)
Aline Hanson, President of the Territorial Council of Saint Martin (2013–2017)
  (overseas collectivity of France)
Prefect – Patrice Latron, Prefect of Saint Pierre and Miquelon (2011–2014)
Head of Government – Stéphane Artano, President of the Territorial Council of Saint Pierre and Miquelon (2006–2018)

Monarch – Elizabeth II, Queen of Saint Vincent and the Grenadines (1979–present)
Governor-General – Sir Frederick Ballantyne, Governor-General of Saint Vincent and the Grenadines (2002–2019)
Prime Minister – Ralph Gonsalves, Prime Minister of Saint Vincent and the Grenadines (2001–present)
 (constituent country of the Kingdom of the Netherlands)
Governor – Eugene Holiday, Governor of Sint Maarten (2010–present)
Prime Minister – Sarah Wescot-Williams, Prime Minister of Sint Maarten (2010–2014)

President –
George Maxwell Richards, President of Trinidad and Tobago (2003–2013)
Anthony Carmona, President of Trinidad and Tobago (2013–2018)
Prime Minister – Kamla Persad-Bissessar, Prime Minister of Trinidad and Tobago (2010–2015)
 (Overseas Territory of the United Kingdom)
Governor –
Ric Todd, Governor of the Turks and Caicos Islands (2011–2013)
Anya Williams, Acting Governor of the Turks and Caicos Islands (2013)
Huw O. Shepheard, Acting Governor of the Turks and Caicos Islands (2013)
Peter Beckingham, Governor of the Turks and Caicos Islands (2013–2016)
Premier – Rufus Ewing, Premier of the Turks and Caicos Islands (2012–2016)

President – Barack Obama, President of the United States (2009–2017)
 (Commonwealth of the United States)
Governor –
Luis Fortuño, Governor of Puerto Rico (2009–2013)
Alejandro García Padilla, Governor of Puerto Rico (2013–2017)
 (insular area of the United States)
Governor – John de Jongh, Governor of the United States Virgin Islands (2007–2015)

Oceania
 (unorganised, unincorporated territory of the United States)
Governor –
Togiola Tulafono, Governor of American Samoa (2003–2013)
Lolo Matalasi Moliga, Governor of American Samoa (2013–2021)

Monarch – Elizabeth II, Queen of Australia (1952–present)
Governor-General – Quentin Bryce, Governor-General of Australia (2008–2014)
Prime Minister –
Julia Gillard, Prime Minister of Australia (2010–2013)
Kevin Rudd, Prime Minister of Australia (2013)
Tony Abbott, Prime Minister of Australia (2013–2015)
 (external territory of Australia)
Administrator – Jon Stanhope, Administrator of Christmas Island (2012–2014)
Shire-President –
Foo Kee Heng, Shire president of Christmas Island (2011–2013)
Gordon Thomson, Shire president of Christmas Island (2013–present)
 (external territory of Australia)
Administrator – Jon Stanhope, Administrator of the Cocos (Keeling) Islands (2012–2014)
Shire-President – Aindil Minkom, Shire president of the Cocos (Keeling) Islands (2011–2015)
 (self-governing territory of Australia)
Administrator – Neil Pope, Administrator of Norfolk Island (2012–2014)
Chief Minister –
David Buffett, Chief Minister of Norfolk Island (2010–2013)
Lisle Snell, Chief Minister of Norfolk Island (2013–2015)

President – Ratu Epeli Nailatikau, President of Fiji (2009–2015)
Prime Minister – Frank Bainimarama, Prime Minister of Fiji (2007–present)
  (overseas collectivity of France)
High Commissioner –
Jean-Pierre Laflaquière, High Commissioner of the Republic in French Polynesia (2012–2013)
Gilles Cantal, Acting High Commissioner of the Republic in French Polynesia (2013)
Lionel Beffre, High Commissioner of the Republic in French Polynesia (2013–2016)
President –
Oscar Temaru, President of French Polynesia (2011–2013)
Gaston Flosse, President of French Polynesia (2013–2014)
 (insular area of the United States)
Governor – Eddie Baza Calvo, Governor of Guam (2011–2019)

President – Anote Tong, President of Kiribati (2003–2016)

President – Christopher Loeak, President of the Marshall Islands (2012–2016)

President – Manny Mori, President of Micronesia (2007–2015)

President –
Sprent Dabwido, President of Nauru (2011–2013)
Baron Waqa, President of Nauru (2013–2019)
  (sui generis collectivity of France)
High Commissioner –
Albert Dupuy, High Commissioner of New Caledonia (2010–2013)
Thierry Suquet, Acting High Commissioner of New Caledonia (2013)
Jean-Jacques Brot, High Commissioner of New Caledonia (2013–2014)
Head of Government – Harold Martin, President of the Government of New Caledonia (2011–2014)

Monarch – Elizabeth II, Queen of New Zealand (1952–present)
Governor-General – Sir Jerry Mateparae, Governor-General of New Zealand (2011–2016)
Prime Minister – John Key, Prime Minister of New Zealand (2008–2016)
 (associated state of New Zealand)
Queen's Representative –
Sir Frederick Tutu Goodwin, Queen's Representative of the Cook Islands (2001–2013)
Tom Marsters, Queen's Representative of the Cook Islands (2013–present)
Prime Minister – Henry Puna, Prime Minister of the Cook Islands (2010–2020)
 (associated state of New Zealand)
Premier – Toke Talagi, Premier of Niue (2008–present)
 (dependent territory of New Zealand)
Administrator – Jonathan Kings, Administrator of Tokelau (2011–2015)
Head of Government –
Kerisiano Kalolo, Head of Government of Tokelau (2012–2013)
Salesio Lui, Head of Government of Tokelau (2013–2014)
 (Commonwealth of the United States)
Governor –
Benigno Fitial, Governor of the Northern Mariana Islands (2006–2013)
Eloy Inos, Governor of the Northern Mariana Islands (2013–2015)

President –
Johnson Toribiong, President of Palau (2009–2013)
Tommy Remengesau, President of Palau (2013–2021)

Monarch – Elizabeth II, Queen of Papua New Guinea (1975–present)
Governor-General – Sir Michael Ogio, Governor-General of Papua New Guinea (2011–2017)
Prime Minister – Peter O'Neill, Prime Minister of Papua New Guinea (2011–2019)
 (Overseas Territory of the United Kingdom)
Governor – Victoria Treadell, Governor of the Pitcairn Islands (2010–2014)
Mayor – Mike Warren, Mayor of the Pitcairn Islands (2008–2013)

Head of State – Tufuga Efi, O le Ao o le Malo of Samoa (2007–2017)
Prime Minister – Tuilaepa Aiono Sailele Malielegaoi, Prime Minister of Samoa (1998–2021)

Monarch – Elizabeth II, Queen of the Solomon Islands (1978–present)
Governor-General – Sir Frank Kabui, Governor-General of the Solomon Islands (2009–2019)
Prime Minister – Gordon Darcy Lilo, Prime Minister of the Solomon Islands (2011–2014)

Monarch – Tupou VI, King of Tonga (2012–present)
Prime Minister – Sialeʻataongo Tuʻivakanō, Prime Minister of Tonga (2010–2014)

Monarch – Elizabeth II, Queen of Tuvalu (1978–present)
Governor-General – Sir Iakoba Italeli, Governor-General of Tuvalu (2010–2019)
Prime Minister –
Willy Telavi, Prime Minister of Tuvalu (2010–2013)
Enele Sopoaga, Prime Minister of Tuvalu (2013–2019)

President – Iolu Abil, President of Vanuatu (2009–2014)
Prime Minister –
Sato Kilman, Prime Minister of Vanuatu (2011–2013)
Ham Lini, Acting Prime Minister of Vanuatu (2013)
Moana Carcasses Kalosil, Prime Minister of Vanuatu (2013–2014)
  (overseas collectivity of France)
Administrator Superior –
Michel Jeanjean, Administrator Superior of Wallis and Futuna (2010–2013)
Michel Aubouin, Administrator Superior of Wallis and Futuna (2013–2015)
Head of Government –
Sosefo Suve, President of the Territorial Assembly of Wallis and Futuna (2012–2013)
Nivaleta Iloai, President of the Territorial Assembly of Wallis and Futuna (2013)
Petelo Hanisi, President of the Territorial Assembly of Wallis and Futuna (2013–2014)

South America

President – Cristina Fernández de Kirchner, President of Argentina (2007–2015)

President – Evo Morales, President of Bolivia (2006–2019)

President – Dilma Rousseff, President of Brazil (2011–2016)

President – Sebastián Piñera, President of Chile (2010–2014)

President – Juan Manuel Santos, President of Colombia (2010–2018)

President – Rafael Correa, President of Ecuador (2007–2017)
 (Overseas Territory of the United Kingdom)
Governor – Nigel Haywood, Governor of the Falkland Islands (2010–2014)
Head of Government – Keith Padgett, Chief Executive of the Falkland Islands (2012–2016)

President – Donald Ramotar, President of Guyana (2011–2015)
Prime Minister – Sam Hinds, Prime Minister of Guyana (1999–2015)
 
President –
Federico Franco, President of Paraguay (2012–2013)
Horacio Cartes, President of Paraguay (2013–2018)

President – Ollanta Humala, President of Peru (2011–2016)
Prime Minister –
Juan Jiménez Mayor, President of the Council of Ministers of Peru (2012–2013)
César Villanueva, President of the Council of Ministers of Peru (2013–2014)

President – Dési Bouterse, President of Suriname (2010–2020)

President – José Mujica, President of Uruguay (2010–2015)

President –
Hugo Chávez, President of Venezuela (2002–2013)
Nicolás Maduro, President of Venezuela (2013–present)

Notes

External links
Rulersa list of rulers throughout time and places
WorldStatesmenan online encyclopedia of the leaders of nations and territories

State leaders
State leaders
State leaders
2013